Apogeshna is a genus of moths of the family Crambidae.

Species
Apogeshna infirmalis (Möschler, 1886)
Apogeshna stenialis (Guenée, 1854)

References

Spilomelinae
Crambidae genera
Taxa named by Eugene G. Munroe